Cardamine gouldii is a plant species endemic to Bhutan. It is known only from a single specimen in the herbarium of Kew Botanic Garden in London, collected in 1938 in the Bumthang District.

Cardamine gouldii is a perennial herb. Middle leaves have 5 leaflets, upper leaves have 3 leaflets. Petiole is 1–3 cm long, slightly winged, not auriculate. Leaflets are oblong to lanceolate, up to 5 cm long. Flowers white, with oblong petals up to 15 mm long.

References

gouldii
Endemic flora of Bhutan